() is the rank held by field officers in the militaries of China and Taiwan. The Chinese military (PLA) uses four grades while the Taiwanese military uses only three, with the rank equivalent to the fourth being treated as a general officer rank.  This difference is found in other militaries as well: in the British Army a brigadier is considered a field officer, while the equivalent rank in the United States Army, brigadier general, is considered a general officer. The Chinese use the same rank names for all services, prefixed by hai jun (海军, Naval Force) or kong jun (空军, Air Force).  While the Taiwanese military (ROC) does the same for enlisted ranks and company-grade officers, it has distinct names for the higher naval ranks.

Usage

See also

Jiang (rank)
Wei (rank)
Ranks of the People's Liberation Army
Ranks of the People's Liberation Army Navy
Ranks of the People's Liberation Army Air Force
Republic of China Armed Forces rank insignia

References

Military ranks of the People's Republic of China
Military of the Republic of China